William Curran Dawson (September 17, 1818 - June 11, 1893) represented Russell County, Alabama in the state legislature in 1855. He fought in the Creek War of 1836 and was a merchant and planter at Glenville, Alabama.  He was born in Greene County, Georgia, the son of Thomas Dawson.

References
A collection of family records, with biographical sketches and other memoranda of various families and individuals bearing the name Dawson, or allied to families of that name. Comp. by Charles C. Dawson, pp 382-383.  Albany, N.Y.:  J. Munsell, 1874.

External links

1818 births
1893 deaths
People from Russell County, Alabama
People from Greene County, Georgia
United States Army soldiers
Members of the Alabama House of Representatives
American planters
19th-century American politicians